HD 25558, also known as V1133 Tauri and by its Flamsteed designation 40 Tauri, is a star located about 700 light years from the Earth, in the constellation Taurus. Its apparent magnitude is about 5.3, making it faintly visible to the naked eye of an observer far from city lights. It is a variable star, ranging in brightness from Hipparcos magnitude 5.28 to 5.32 over a period of 1.53232423 days.

In 1998, HD 25558 was discovered to be a variable star by Christoffel Waelkens et al. who analyzed the Hipparcos photometric data for hundreds of stars, and classified HD 25558 as a slowly pulsating B star with a period of 1.53 days.

Beginning in 2008, HD 25558 was the subject of an observing campaign by Ádám Sódor et al. who gathered data collected from 17 observatories on the ground and in space. This star was chosen for the project because it is relatively bright, located near the celestial equator (and thus observable from almost anywhere on Earth), and the slow rotation indicated in earlier studies would simplify the interpretation of spectra.   The investigators concluded that HD 25558 is a spectroscopic binary with a period of about 8.9 years, but not enough data was available to derive a full description of the orbit. Both components of the binary show detectable stellar pulsations. The primary star rotates with a period of about 6 days, and the secondary rotates in just 1.2 days.  The primary has no detectable magnetic field, but the secondary's field strength is at least a few hundred gauss. The dominant 1.53 day pulsation period arises from the primary star and those pulsations were coherent over the 20 year period spanned by the data used in the study.

Notes

References

Slowly pulsating B stars
Taurus (constellation)
18957
25558
Durchmusterung objects
Tauri, V1133
Tauri, 40
B-type main-sequence stars